Deh Bureh (also Romanized as Deh Būreh; also known as Deh Būt) is a village in Tariq ol Eslam Rural District, in the Central District of Nahavand County, Hamadan Province, Iran. At the 2006 census, its population was 807, in 207 families.

References 

Populated places in Nahavand County